
The Whakatane Board Mills Line of 10 km length was opened about 1939 as a freight only line, and was sometimes referred to as a "private siding".

The line had previously operated from 1937 as a private siding, then as the Matahina Tramway. Two FA class steam locomotives were purchased from New Zealand Government Railways, No 41 in 1937 and No 250 in 1943. The maximum speed on the line was originally 10 mph, then 20 mph; and trains were piloted over level crossings.
 
Later two Drewry diesel shunting locomotives built in 1949 and 1950 were used to haul log wagons from the Whakatane Board Mills timber mill on the western side of the Whakatane River at Whakatane to the Taneatua Branch terminal at Awakeri. The line never had passenger services.

Tranz Rail took over operations from 3 October 1999, and renamed the line the Whakatane Industrial Siding.

The line was closed on 3 December 2001, and the track was lifted in 2006.

References

Citations

Bibliography

External links  

Railway lines in New Zealand
Rail transport in the Bay of Plenty Region
Railway lines opened in 1939
Railway lines closed in 2001
3 ft 6 in gauge railways in New Zealand
Whakatāne
Closed railway lines in New Zealand